Heliconius metharme is a species of butterfly of the family Nymphalidae. It was described by Wilhelm Ferdinand Erichson in 1849. It is widespread in the Amazon basin, Venezuela and the Guianas. The habitat consists of deep forests.

It is part of a mimicry ring with Heliconius sara, Heliconius wallacei and Heliconius doris.

The larvae are gregarious and feed on Dilkea and Mitostemma species.

Subspecies
Heliconius metharme metharme — Guyana
Heliconius metharme makiritare (Brown & Fernández, 1985) — Venezuela
Heliconius metharme perseis Stichel, 1923 — Colombia

References

 Neruda metharme at Insecta.pro

Butterflies described in 1849
Heliconius